Aglais rizana, the mountain tortoiseshell, is a species of nymphalid butterfly found in Asia.

Distribution
Pamirs to Alay Range, Afghanistan, northwest Himalayas.

Description

Frederic Moore (1872) gives a detailed description for Vanessa rizana:

References

Fauna of Afghanistan
Nymphalini
Butterflies described in 1872
Taxa named by Frederic Moore
Butterflies of Asia